The Minister of Culture of Latvia is a member of the Cabinet of Ministers of Latvia, and is the political leader of the Ministry of Culture of Latvia. Nauris Puntulis is the current minister since 8 July 2019.

Ministers of Culture of the Republic of Latvia

Ministers of Culture of the Latvian SSR during the Soviet occupation of Latvia

Notes 

 
Culture